Petr Hannig is a Czech singer, producer, politician and leader of the Party of Common Sense.

In July 2017, he announced his candidacy for the president of the Czech Republic in the 2018 election. Having finished seventh in the first round with 0.56% of the vote, Hannig then endorsed Miloš Zeman for the second round.

Hannig is a Roman Catholic.

Election history

References

Candidates in the 2018 Czech presidential election
1946 births
Living people
Politicians from Ústí nad Labem
Czech Roman Catholics
Academy of Performing Arts in Prague alumni